Hilmarsson is an Icelandic surname, and means 'son of Hilmar'. In Icelandic names, the name is not strictly a surname, but a patronymic. It may refer to:

 Arnar Rósenkranz Hilmarsson, drummer of Of Monsters and Men
 Atli Hilmarsson (born 1959), Icelandic handball player and Olypmpian
 Hilmar Örn Hilmarsson (born 1958), musician, art director and allsherjargoði of Ásatrúarfélagið
 Jörundur Garðar Hilmarsson (1946–1992), Icelandic linguist, grammarian and expert in Tocharian and Indo-European languages
 Siggi Hilmarsson, founder of Siggi's Dairy

See also
 Hilmar (disambiguation)